The 1989 WAFU Club Championship was the thirteenth football club tournament season that took place for the runners-up of each West African country's domestic league, the West African Club Championship. It was won by Nigeria's Ranchers Bees after defeating ASEC Abidjan under the away goals rule with a total of 4-3 goals in two matches.  A total of 37 goals were scored, second time in a row, fewer than last season. Originally a 28 match season, neither clubs from the Gambia, Guinea-Bissau, Mauritania nor Togo participated. Invincible Eleven directly headed to the semis, later Ranchers Bees directly headed to the finals.

Preliminary round

|}

Quarterfinals

|}

Semifinals

|}

Finals

|}

Winners

See also
1989 African Cup of Champions Clubs
1989 CAF Cup Winners' Cup

Notes

References

External links
Full results of the 1989 WAFU Club Championship at RSSSF

West African Club Championship
1989 in African football